The XIX Island Games (also known as the 2023 NatWest Island Games for sponsorship reasons) were to have been held in Guernsey, Channel Islands in 2021 however due to the COVID-19 pandemic the games have been postponed. This occasion will be the third time that the island has hosted the games, the first being in 1987, the second in 2003.

When rescheduled, the week long event will see around 3,000 competitors from 24 islands take part in 12 sports.

Host

The Faroe Islands were initially chosen to host the games but pulled out of doing so in early 2015. In July 2016 the Island Games AGM unanimously decided to award the games to Guernsey.

The Guernsey organising committee chair is Dame Mary Perkins, supported by Peter Vidamour as sports director and Ian Damarell as Finance Director. The International Island Games Association (IIGA) advisor is Eric Legg.

Participating islands
It is likely that 24 island entities of the IIGA, from Europe, South Atlantic and the Caribbean area will compete in these Games.

Sports
The sports selection is expected to follow the same itinerary as the 2019 Island Games however the included sports may change.

Numbers in parentheses indicate the number of medal events contested in each sport.

References

Island Games
Multi-sport events in the Channel Islands
Island Games
Sports competitions in Guernsey
International sports competitions hosted by the Channel Islands
Island Games 2021